Cyclosia papilionaris, Drury's jewel, is a moth in the family Zygaenidae. It was described by Dru Drury in 1773. It is found from Thailand to southern China. It is also found in Andaman and Nicobar Islands, India. The habitat consists of rainforests and humid deciduous forests at altitudes up to 1,000 meters.

The larvae feed on Aporusa dioica.

Subspecies
Cyclosia papilionaris papilionaris (China)
Cyclosia papilionaris adusta Jordan, 1907
Cyclosia papilionaris australinda (Hampson, 1891) (southern India)
Cyclosia papilionaris mekongensis Nakamura, 1974 (Laos)
Cyclosia papilionaris nicobarensis Hering, 1922 (Nicobar Islands)
Cyclosia papilionaris nigrescens Moore, 1877 (Andamans)
Cyclosia papilionaris philippinensis Draeseke, 1924 (Polilo)
Cyclosia papilionaris venaria (Fabricius, 1775) (Bhutan, India: Sikkim, Assam)

References

Moths described in 1773
Chalcosiinae
Taxa named by Dru Drury